The Cello Sonata in G minor, Op. 65, was written by Frédéric Chopin in 1846-1847. It is one of only nine works of Chopin published during his lifetime that were written for instruments other than piano (although the piano still appears in every work he wrote). Chopin composed four sonatas, the other three being piano sonatas. The cello sonata was the last of Chopin's works to be published in his lifetime.

The sonata was written for and dedicated to Auguste Franchomme. The sonata is remarkable for the concentration of its material: much of the music of the first movement grows out of the cello’s opening statement, and certain theme-shapes appear in all its movements. The last three movements were first publicly performed by Franchomme and Chopin at the composer's last public concert, at the Salle Pleyel on 16 February 1848.

Structure

The composition consists of four movements:

Allegro moderato in G minor
Scherzo in D minor, Trio in D major
Largo in B-flat major
Finale. Allegro in G minor, ending in G major

It takes around 30 minutes to perform.

Media

References 
Notes

Sources

External links 
 

Compositions by Frédéric Chopin
Chopin
1846 compositions
Compositions in G minor